The 1904 United States presidential election in Texas took place on November 8, 1904. All contemporary 45 states were part of the 1904 United States presidential election. Texas voters chose 18 electors to the Electoral College, which selected the president and vice president.

Texas was won by the Democratic nominees, Chief Judge Alton B. Parker of New York and his running mate Henry G. Davis of West Virginia. As of the 2020 election, this was the last election which Duval County voted for the Republican candidate.

Results

See also
 United States presidential elections in Texas

Notes

References

Texas
1904
1904 Texas elections